The Chesapeake Raid was an American Revolutionary War campaign by British naval forces under the command of Commodore Sir George Collier and land forces led by Major General Edward Mathew.  Between 10 May and 24 May 1779 these forces raided economic and military targets up and down Chesapeake Bay. The speed with which the British moved caught many of the bay's communities by surprise, so there was little to no resistance. The British destroyed economically important supplies of tobacco and coal, and destroyed naval ships, port facilities, and storehouses full of military supplies.

References
Russell, David. The American Revolution in the Southern Colonies

Conflicts in 1779
Battles in the Southern theater of the American Revolutionary War 1775–1779
Battles of the American Revolutionary War in Maryland
Battles of the American Revolutionary War in Virginia
Battles involving Great Britain
Battles involving the United States
1779 in Maryland
1779 in Virginia
Military raids